Dušan Macháček (born 7 October 1966) is a Czech rower. He competed at the 1988 Summer Olympics and the 1992 Summer Olympics.

References

1966 births
Living people
Czech male rowers
Olympic rowers of Czechoslovakia
Rowers at the 1988 Summer Olympics
Rowers at the 1992 Summer Olympics
Rowers from Prague